Loyal is a 1988 album by New Zealand singer-songwriter Dave Dobbyn. After the Footrot Flats album, Loyal moved him further away from the pub rock of DD Smash and into contemporary pop rock. The album "confronts love, loyalty and the power of personal politics." The album reached number 9 on the New Zealand music charts.

The hit single Slice of Heaven from the Footrot Flats soundtrack was also included on the album, despite it being nearly two years old at the time of the album release. Dobbyn commented that the song fitted in with the general theme of loyalty.

Track listing

Charts

Awards
'Loyal' was awarded 'Best Album' at the 1988 New Zealand Music Awards. Dobbyn was also awarded 'Best Male Vocalist' (for the second year in a row).
In 2012 journalist Simon Sweetman suggested that the album cover was one of the five worst in the history of New Zealand music.

Credits
 Backing Vocals – Annie Crummer, Bunny Walters, Margaret Urlich, Mark Punch, Mark Williams, Wendy Matthews
 Bass – Ian Belton
 Drums – Mark Myer, Peter Warren, Ricky Fataar
 Keyboards – Bruce Lynch
 Producer – Bruce Lynch, Dave Dobbyn, Mark Moffat
 Saxophone – Tony Buchanan
 Vocals, Guitar, Keyboards – Dave Dobbyn
 Written By – Dave Dobbyn

References

External links
 The Likely Lad. Love and Loyalty

Dave Dobbyn albums
1988 albums